Stefan Mugoša (Montenegrin Cyrillic: Стефан Мугоша; born 26 February 1992) is a Montenegrin professional footballer who plays as a striker for Vissel Kobe in the J1 League, and for the Montenegro national team.

Club career

Early career
At 22 years of age, Mugoša was the top scorer in the Montenegrin First League in 2014, scoring 15 goals in 29 league appearances. As a result of his performance, foreign clubs started to show interest in him. Mugoša joined German 2. Bundesliga club 1. FC Kaiserslautern in summer 2014 signing a three-year-contract. In January 2015, after only two games (one each in the league and cup), he was loaned to Erzgebirge Aue for the rest of the season. Aue were not granted a purchase option. After Aue was relegated to 3. Liga at the end of the season, Mugoša returned to Kaiserslautern before transferring to 2. Bundesliga competitor 1860 Munich.

1860 Munich
On 15 August 2015, Mugoša signed a three-year-contract with 1860 Munich. On 27 November 2015, he scored his first goal for 1860 Munich in a 2–1 win against Mainz in the DFB-Pokal.

Incheon United
In January 2018 Mugoša joined K League 1 side Incheon United. In January 2019 he extended his contract with Incheon United to 2021. On 1 September 2019, he scored a hat-trick in a 3–3 tie with Ulsan Hyundai FC.

Vissel Kobe
In 30 June 2022 he was unveiled as the J1 League club Vissel Kobe second signing of the Japanese mid-season window, joining the club in a full transfer.

International career
In August 2012 he participated in the Valeri Lobanovsky Memorial Tournament 2012, where his team lost in the final to Slovakia on penalties and took home silver medals.

He made his debut for Montenegro on 8 June 2015 in a friendly against Denmark. He scored his first international goal on 26 March 2017, in a 2018 FIFA World Cup qualification match against Poland.

Career statistics

International
Scores and results list Montenegro's goal tally first, score column indicates score after each Mugoša goal.

Honours
Budućnost Podgorica
 Prva CFL: 2011–12
 Montenegrin Cup: 2012–13

Sheriff Tiraspol
 Divizia Națională: 2017
Individual
 Prva CFL Top scorer: 2013–14
 Montenegrin Footballer of the Year: 2019

References

External links
 
 

1992 births
Living people
Footballers from Podgorica
Association football forwards
Montenegrin footballers
Montenegro youth international footballers
Montenegro under-21 international footballers
Montenegro international footballers
FK Budućnost Podgorica players
OFK Titograd players
1. FC Kaiserslautern players
FC Erzgebirge Aue players
TSV 1860 Munich players
Karlsruher SC players
FC Sheriff Tiraspol players
Incheon United FC players
Vissel Kobe players
Montenegrin First League players
2. Bundesliga players
Moldovan Super Liga players
K League 1 players
J1 League players
Montenegrin expatriate footballers
Expatriate footballers in Germany
Montenegrin expatriate sportspeople in Germany
Expatriate footballers in Moldova
Montenegrin expatriate sportspeople in Moldova
Expatriate footballers in South Korea
Montenegrin expatriate sportspeople in South Korea